Sjælland Rundt (lit. Round Zealand Race) is a sailing race around the Danish island Zealand. It is organized by the Elsinore Sailing Club

History
The race was first held on 29 June 1947. During the 1980s, Sjælland Rundt had over 2000 competing boats, making it the biggest sailing race in the world.

Races
The 2020 race was announced to be June 25-28.

Sponsorships
The event is from 2017 sponsored by Hempel Group.

References

Sailing competitions in Denmark
Recurring sporting events established in 1947
Zealand
1947 establishments in Denmark